Red Notice is a 2021 American action comedy film written and directed by Rawson Marshall Thurber starring Dwayne Johnson alongside Ryan Reynolds and Gal Gadot and Ritu Arya. It marks the third collaboration between Thurber and Johnson, following Central Intelligence (2016) and Skyscraper (2018). In the film, an FBI agent reluctantly teams up with a renowned art robber in order to catch an even more notorious robber. 

Originally planned for release by Universal Pictures, the film was acquired by Netflix for distribution. It began a limited theatrical release on November 5, 2021, before digitally streaming on the platform on November 12, 2021, where it received negative reviews from critics. Netflix claims the film became the most-watched film in its debut weekend, as well as the most-watched film within 28 days of release on the platform in Netflix. It also became the 5th most-streamed movie title of 2021. Two sequels are in development and will be filmed back-to-back with Johnson, Reynolds, Gadot, and Thurber expected to return.

Plot
During the 1st century BC, Roman general Mark Antony gives Egyptian queen Cleopatra three bejeweled eggs as a wedding gift to show his devotion. The eggs are lost in time until two are found by a farmer in 1907, but the last one remains lost.

In the present day, John Hartley, an FBI agent, is assigned to assist Interpol agent Urvashi Das in investigating the potential theft of one of the eggs on display at the Museo Nazionale di Castel Sant'Angelo in Rome. The head of security dismisses the concerns, but Hartley reveals the egg is a forgery and the real egg has been stolen. Before the room is sealed shut, international art thief Nolan Booth manages to escape with the egg. Arriving at his home in Bali with the egg, he finds Hartley, along with Das and an Interpol strike team there. They arrest Booth and take the egg into custody. Unbeknownst to everyone, his main competition, Sarah "The Bishop" Black, disguised as one of the strike team members, swaps the real egg with another forgery. The next day, Das confronts Hartley and has him incarcerated in a remote Russian prison in the same cell as Booth, believing he's responsible for the theft. 

Shortly after arrival, Black proposes that Booth work with her to find the third egg as he knows about its whereabouts. He declines her modest offer, so Hartley suggests they work together to defeat her; if Booth helps him imprison her, Booth will be the number one art thief in the world. The pair escapes from prison, heading to Valencia to steal the second egg, in possession of notorious arms dealer Sotto Voce who is having a masquerade ball. They find Black, who is also there to steal it. The three arrive in Voce's vault where Hartley and Booth fight her. Voce arrives with his security detail while Black reveals she is working with Voce. They torture Hartley until Booth reveals the location of the third egg. Black betrays Voce and leaves for Egypt where Booth claims it is. After leaving Valencia, Booth reveals to Hartley that the egg is actually in Argentina, a location only he knows as it was inscribed on his late father's beloved watch which had once belonged to Adolf Hitler's personal art curator Rudolph Zeich. 

Searching the jungle, they find a secret bunker containing countless Nazi artifacts, including the third egg. Black arrives and steals the egg from them, only to be interrupted by Das and a team of local police. Hartley, Booth and Black escape in an antique 1931 Mercedes-Benz 770, chased by Das in an armored vehicle. Eventually, they exit near the top of a waterfall where they jump. Booth swims to shore with the egg, only to discover that Hartley is actually not an FBI profiler, but a conman like his father, and shares the Bishop mantle with Black; Hartley and Black are romantically involved, work together as a team, and have planned the entire heist from the very beginning, intentionally using Booth to take them to the third egg. 

Booth surrenders the egg and they leave him handcuffed. In Cairo, Hartley and Black deliver the three eggs to an Egyptian billionaire, in time for his daughter's wedding although she is more excited for the wedding singer Ed Sheeran. The wedding is subsequently interrupted by an Interpol raid by Das, who arrest the billionaire, his daughter, and Sheeran.

Six months later, Hartley and Black are met again by Booth in Sardinia, who informs them that he told Das about their Cayman Islands account containing the $300 million payout, which Das freezes leaving them with no money. Booth also reveals that Interpol is on their way to capture them, but offers a chance to escape if they help him with a new heist, which requires three individuals to pull off. They agree and escape, where Das places red notices on all three of them as they begin their heist at the Louvre in Paris.

Cast 
 Dwayne Johnson as John Hartley
 Ryan Reynolds as Nolan Booth
 Gal Gadot as Sarah Black / The Bishop
 Chris Diamantopoulos as Sotto Voce
 Ritu Arya as Inspector Urvashi Das
 Ivan Mbakop as Tambwe
 Vincenzo Amato as Director Gallo
 Rafael Petardi as Security Chief Ricci
 Brenna Marie Narayan as Cleopatra

Additionally, Daniel Bernhardt has a cameo appearance as Drago Grande, and singer-songwriter Ed Sheeran makes an uncredited cameo as himself.

Production

Development 
On February 8, 2018, it was announced that major studios were fighting a bidding war for the rights to an action comedy from Dwayne Johnson and writer-director Rawson Marshall Thurber. Universal Pictures, Warner Bros. Pictures, Sony Pictures and Paramount Pictures  were all considered. The film would be produced by Beau Flynn through his Flynn Picture Company, and by Johnson, Dany Garcia and Hiram Garcia through their Seven Bucks Productions banner, along with Thurber's Bad Version Inc., with Wendy Jacobson executive producing. The following day, it was announced that Universal and Legendary had won the bidding war.

Gal Gadot was confirmed to star opposite Johnson in June 2018, and Ryan Reynolds was added in July 2019. Ritu Arya and Chris Diamantopoulos were also cast in February 2020.

Johnson, Reynolds, and Gadot were all paid $20 million each to star in the film, while Thurber was paid $10 million to write and direct. After working on the film, Gadot became the third highest-paid actress in the world in 2020.

At a budget of $200 million, Red Notice is Netflix's most expensive original film to date.

Filming 
Principal photography began on January 3, 2020, in Atlanta, Georgia. Production on the film was previously expected to start in April 2019, after Johnson wrapped filming on Jumanji: The Next Level. On July 8, 2019, filming was delayed to early 2020. A planned shoot in Italy was canceled due to the COVID-19 pandemic in the country. On March 14, it was announced production had been halted indefinitely due to the COVID-19 pandemic overall.

Filming resumed on September 14, 2020. Reynolds and Gadot completed filming their scenes by the end of October. Production in Atlanta was completed on November 14, before moving to Rome and Sardinia, Italy for a week of shooting. Filming in Italy was completed on November 18. The film was greenlit with an estimated production budget of $160 million and by the time it was released the reported cost had reached $200 million, making it the most expensive film in Netflix's history.

Visual effects artist Richard R. Hoover served as the overall visual effects supervisor for the film.

Red Notice is one of the first feature films to extensively use the first-person view (FPV) drone flying for cinematography. FPV drone pilot Johnny Schaer participated in filming.

Music 
On February 26, 2020, Steve Jablonsky was announced as the composer for Red Notice. Jablonsky previously collaborated with director Rawson Marshall Thurber scoring Skyscraper in 2018. Other pieces include "Sabotage" by the Beastie Boys, "Época" by the Gotan Project, "Amado Mio" by Pink Martini, "Downtown" written by Tony Hatch, The Raider's March by John Williams, "Libertango by Astor Piazzolla", "Perfect" by Ed Sheeran, and "Notorious B.I.G." by The Notorious B.I.G., with "On the Run" by Naz Tokio heard throughout the closing credits.

Release 
Universal originally scheduled the film for release on June 12, 2020. The date was postponed by five months to November 13, 2020. Netflix then took over on July 8, 2019, moving the film to an unspecified date in 2021. As part of a video and letter to its shareholders in April 2021, Netflix's co-chief executive officer and chief content officer Ted Sarandos confirmed that the film would premiere sometime in Q4 2021. The film received a limited theatrical release on November 5, 2021, prior to streaming on Netflix on November 12, 2021.  Reynolds requested that Welsh language subtitles be provided for the film's Netflix release.

Marketing 
In the Philippines, the SM Mall of Asia's globe was reportedly stolen by a helicopter on November 13, 2021. The Pasay city police issued a statement that the globe was not stolen and was just "undergoing maintenance for marketing strategy". The globe was covered in scaffolding. The mall management released a statement a day later that the globe is "back" and revealed that the supposed theft was staged as part of a publicity stunt to promote Red Notice. The marketing promotion caused the globe to be a trending subject on Twitter.

The film also saw a promotional tie-in with professional wrestling promotion WWE, the company where Dwayne Johnson had wrestled and became famously known as "The Rock". In addition to promoting the film during their Survivor Series event on November 21, 2021, a storyline was also played out involving one of Cleopatra's eggs that was stolen during the show.

Reception

Audience viewership 
Due to the film's $200 million production budget and Netflix's global film chief Scott Stuber's statement that the company's "big-budget tentpole films [need] to draw an audience of more than 70 million viewers within the first 28 days of availability," The New York Observer estimated Red Notice would need to total around 200 million hours (about 83 million household viewers) to be deemed a success.

The film became the most-viewed film on Netflix during release day. According to Samba TV, the film was watched by 4.2 million households in the United States, 721,000 in the United Kingdom, 332,000 in Germany, and 42,000 in Australia over its first three days of release. TV Time reported that it was the second most-streamed film in the United States during its debut weekend. The top 10 Netflix weekly rankings for English-language films showed that it was the most-streamed film with 148.72 million hours watched. This was the highest viewership for any film on Netflix during its debut weekend. It was also ranked in the top 10 Netflix charts in 94 countries. According to Nielsen it was the most-streamed film in the United States, with 1,843 million minutes viewed and age ranges of 18–34, 35–49 and 50–64 making up a quarter each of its audience.

In the second week of release it had a viewership of 129.11 million hours, making it the second-most-watched film on Netflix within 28 days of release. It retained its position on the Nielsen chart for films, with a viewership of 1,710 million minutes. Within eleven days of its release, it displaced Bird Box to become the most-watched film on Netflix within 28 days of release. It retained its position on the Netflix chart in the third week with 50.65 million hours viewed. It also remained in the top 10 Netflix rankings in 94 countries during the second and third week, while TV Time reported that it was the most-streamed film in the United States during both the weeks. According to Nielsen, it remained the most-streamed-film in the United States in the third week with a viewership of 953 million minutes.

The fourth week saw Red Notice being displaced to the third position on Netflix's chart with 25.4 million hours viewed, while according to TV Time it remained the most-streamed film in the United States during the week. It also fell to the third position on Nielsen's chart, with a viewership of 353 million minutes. The following week it rose to the second position on Netflix's chart with a viewership of 18.01 million hours, while dropping to the second position on TV Time's rankings. According to Nielsen, it remained the third-most-streamed-film in the United States with a viewership of 280 million minutes. In the sixth week it dropped to the fourth position on Netflix with a viewership of 12.71 million hours, while also dropping to the fourth place on TV Time's rankings.

Netflix revealed on December 28, 2021, that Red Notice accumulated a viewership of 364.02 million hours in its first 28 days of release. According to Samba TV, the film was watched in 9.8 million households in its first 30 days of release. In the seventh week, the film dropped to the seventh position on Netflix's weekly rankings for English films, with 12.14 million hours viewed, while also being ranked seventh on TV Time's chart for most-streamed-films for the week in the United States. Nielsen stated that it was the fifth most-streamed-film in the US in 2021 with 5,528 million minutes viewed.

In the eighth week it rose to the fifth position on Netflix's weekly rankings with a viewership of 14.54 million hours, while per Nielsen it was the seventh most-streamed-film in the United States with a viewership of 288 million minutes. In the ninth week it occupied the sixth spot with 11.09 million hours viewed. It retained its position in the following week with 8.71 million hours viewed. In the eleventh week it dropped to the eighth rank with a viewership of 7.31 million hours. The following week it rose to the sixth position despite the viewership dropping to 6.54 million hours. It remained in the top 10 rankings for English-language films on Netflix for three months since its release before dropping out.

Box office 
While Netflix does not disclose theatrical box office grosses of their films, Deadline Hollywood reported the film made $1.25–$1.5 million from 750 theaters in its opening weekend. By November 15, the running theatrical gross was "well north" of $2 million.

Critical response 
On review aggregator Rotten Tomatoes, 36% of 174 critics have given the film a positive review, with an average rating of 4.8/10. The website's critics consensus reads, "Red Notices big budget and A-list cast add up to a slickly competent action comedy whose gaudy ingredients only make the middling results more head-scratching." On Metacritic, the film has a weighted average score of 37 out of 100, based on 38 critics, indicating "generally unfavorable reviews."

Peter Debruge of Variety called the film a "fun, fast-paced and frequently amusing divertissement," and wrote, "It's all reasonably clever, so long as you don't scrutinize it too closely. Red Notice may be Thurber's spin on National Treasure, with just as much DNA from the RKO classic Gunga Din." David Rooney of The Hollywood Reporter stated, "You can't argue with the muscular marquee value of headlining Dwayne Johnson, Ryan Reynolds and Gal Gadot in a slick, fast-paced action thriller laced with playful comedy, even if it's an empty-calorie entertainment like Red Notice." Reviewing the film for the Los Angeles Times, Justin Chang wrote, "A depressing reminder of what Hollywood considers 'original' material these days, Red Notice plays one of those self-consciously convoluted, ultimately derivative long cons that strain so hard to seem breezily insouciant they wind up wearing you out. By the end, it's the clichés that warrant a rest."

Future
Beginning in August 2020, there were reports that Netflix was looking to develop a sequel to Red Notice. In November 2021, Hiram Garcia announced that there were tentative plans for a sequel, stating that Thurber had officially pitched a sequel and that all creatives involved were optimistic regarding its development, while announcing that Netflix had officially told them that they were interested in continuing the film series. The producer later said that the potential sequel would include the trio of stars involved in additional heists around the world, while reaffirming that its development was dependent on the reception to the first film.

Johnson celebrated the positive audience reception to Red Notice on his social media, saying that there was "more to come." Following announcements that the release set the record all-time viewership for Netflix, Johnson further teased a future film announcement. Thurber later said that if a sequel was greenlit, he intends to film two sequels back-to-back. In December 2021, Hiram Garcia once again discussed plans for a sequel, stating that the end of Red Notice sets up the story.

By January 2022, it was announced that the two sequels are officially in development and will be filmed back-to-back. Thurber will once again serve as writer/director, while Johnson, Reynolds, Gadot, and Thurber will reprise their respective roles. The sequels will also feature a number of supporting cast, with an ensemble cast planned similar to the Ocean's franchise. Johnson, Hiram Garcia, Dany Garcia, Thurber, and Beau Flynn will return as producers. The films will be joint-venture productions between Seven Bucks Productions, Flynn Pictures Co, Bad Version Productions, and Netflix Original Films. The films will be distributed by Netflix. In October of the same year, it was announced that the script for the second film was finished, while work on the screenplay for the third movie is ongoing. In the same interview, producers Hiram Garcia and Flynn confirmed that the sequels are being developed to be filmed consecutively.

References

External links 
 

2021 action comedy films
2020s crime comedy films
American action comedy films
American crime comedy films
Film productions suspended due to the COVID-19 pandemic
Films postponed due to the COVID-19 pandemic
Films directed by Rawson Marshall Thurber
Films produced by Beau Flynn
Films produced by Dwayne Johnson
Films scored by Steve Jablonsky
Seven Bucks Productions films
Films set in Argentina
Films set in Bali
Films set in Cairo
Films set in London
Films set in Paris
Films set in Rome
Films set in Russia
Films set in Sardinia
Films set in Valencia
Films shot in Atlanta
2020s English-language films
2020s American films